Catocala detrita is a moth in the family Erebidae first described by Warren in 1913. It is found in the Ural Mountains of Russia.

The larvae possibly feed on Salix species.

References

detrita
Moths described in 1913
Moths of Asia
Moths of Europe